Ludivine Lasnier (born 30 May 1985) is a French kickboxer and the former ISKA World K-1 Flyweight champion.

Kickboxing career
Lasnier faced Audrey Cousey for the ISKA Women's European Full Contact Rules Flyweight title at La nuit des Titans on May 31, 2014. She won the fight by decision.

Lasnier faced Ruqsana Begum for the ISKA Women's World K-1 Rules Flyweight title at World Title Fight on March 14, 2015. She won the fight unanimous decision. She made her first title defense against Sara Falchetti at La Nuit Des Titans on June 6, 2015. She won the fight by unanimous decision as well.

Lasnier faced Daniela Vari in a non-title bout at MFC 2 on July 4, 2015. She won the fight by unanimous decision.

She challenged Silvia La Notte for the WAKO World K-1 Rules Super Flyweight championship at Night Of Si'Fight 1 on December 1, 2018. She lost the unanimous decision.

Lasnier faced Ermira Rexhmati at Fight Night One – Si Fight on October 8, 2022. She won the fight by decision.

Championships and accomplishments
International Sports Kickboxing Association
ISKA Women's World K-1 Rules Flyweight Title
One successful title defense
ISKA Women's European Full Contact Rules Flyweight title

Kickboxing record

|-  bgcolor="#CCFFCC"
| 2022-10-08 || Win ||align=left| Ermira Rexhmati || Fight Night One – Si Fight || Troyes, France || Decision || 3 || 3:00
|-
|-  bgcolor="#FFBBBB"
| 2020-08-29 || Loss||align=left| Gloria Peritore || Road to Lion Fight: Sofokleus vs. Carrara || Rosolini, Italy || Decision (Unanimous) || 5 || 3:00
|-
! style=background:white colspan=9 |
|-
|-  bgcolor="#CCFFCC"
| 2019-12-14 || Win||align=left| Inês Calado || Night Of Sifight 2 || Troyes, France || Decision (Unanimous) || 3 || 3:00
|-
|-  bgcolor="#CCFFCC"
| 2019-06-22 || Win||align=left| Juliette Lacroix || C-Fight IX || Cusset, France || Decision (Unanimous) || 3 || 3:00
|-
|-  bgcolor="#FFBBBB"
| 2018-12-01 || Loss||align=left| Silvia La Notte || Night Of Si'Fight 1 || Troyes, France || Decision (Unanimous) || 3 || 3:00
|-
! style=background:white colspan=9 |
|-
|-  bgcolor="#FFBBBB"
| 2018-10-27 || Loss||align=left| Sonia Dihn || Fight Legend || Geneva, Switzerland ||TKO (Punches) || 3 || 
|-
|-  bgcolor="#CCFFCC"
| 2017-11-04 || Win||align=left| Yolande Alonso || Spirit Boxing Show 2 || Nogent-sur-Seine, France || Decision (Unanimous) || 5 || 3:00 
|-
|-  bgcolor="#FFBBBB"
| 2017-06-22 || Loss||align=left| Fadma Basrir || Triumph Fighting Tour || Paris, France || Decision (Unanimous) || 3 || 3:00 
|-
|-  bgcolor="#FFBBBB"
| 2017-03-25 || Loss||align=left| Silvia La Notte || Meaux Fight VI || Meaux, France || Decision (Unanimous) || 3 || 3:00 
|-
|-  bgcolor="#FFBBBB"
| 2016-10-08  || Loss||align=left| Amy Pirnie || Yokkao 19 & 20 || Bolton, England || TKO (Punches) || 2 ||  
|-
|-  bgcolor="#FFBBBB"
| 2016-05-21 || Loss||align=left| Maria Lobo || Radikal Fight Night 4 || Charleville-Mézières, France || Decision || 3 || 3:00  
|-
|-  bgcolor="#FFBBBB"
| 2016-03-05 || Loss||align=left| Soraya Bucherie || Le Choc des Légendes || Saint Ouen, France || Decision || 3 || 3:00  
|-
|-  bgcolor="#CCFFCC"
| 2015-07-04 || Win||align=left| Daniela Vari || MFC 2 || Lons-le-Saunier, France || Decision (Unanimous) || 3 || 3:00 
|-
|-  bgcolor="#CCFFCC"
| 2015-06-06 || Win||align=left| Sara Falchetti || La Nuit Des Titans || Saint-André-les-Vergers, France || Decision (Unanimous) || 3 || 3:00 
|-
! style=background:white colspan=9 |
|-
|-  bgcolor="#CCFFCC"
| 2015-03-14 || Win||align=left| Ruqsana Begum || World Title Fight || London, England || Decision (Unanimous) || 3 || 3:00 
|-
! style=background:white colspan=9 |
|-
|-  bgcolor="#CCFFCC"
| 2014-05-31 || Win||align=left| Audrey Cousey || La nuit des Titans || Saint-André-les-Vergers, France || Decision (Unanimous) || 3 || 3:00 
|-
! style=background:white colspan=9 |
|-
|-
| colspan=9 | Legend:

See also
List of female kickboxers
List of female ISKA champions

References 

French kickboxers

1985 births
Living people
Sportspeople from Troyes